Hrabové is an urban area of Bytča. It lies in the north-west of Slovakia, in the Bytča District of the Žilina region.

Geography of Žilina Region